Seweryn Bialer (November 3, 1926 in Berlin – February 8, 2019 in New York City) was a German-born American academic. He was emeritus professor of political science at Columbia University and an expert on the Communist parties of the Soviet Union and Poland. He was the Director of Columbia's Research Institute on International Change.

Biography
Born in Berlin, Germany, Bialer joined the underground anti-fascist movement in Lodz, Poland in 1942. Between February 1944 and May 1945 he was a prisoner in the Auschwitz concentration camp.

From May 1945 to June 1951 he was member of the Polish communist police force (the Milicja Obywatelska). He also held various positions in the Polish Communist Party (PZPR). He was a political officer of the State Police in Warsaw and a member of the Central Committee of the Polish Worker's Party. Subsequently, beginning in June 1951, he became a Professor at the Institute of Sociology and political editor of the newspaper Trybuna Ludu. He was also a researcher in economics at the Polish Academy of Sciences. During this time he authored several political science textbooks.

In January, 1956, Bialer defected to West Berlin and conducted almost one-year-long interview sessions for Radio Free Europe/Radio Liberty in New York, which was broadcast to Poland during that year.

He moved to New York, eventually receiving a Ph.D. in political science from Columbia. He was appointed Robert and Renee Belfer Professor of Political Science. In 1983 he was awarded a prestigious MacArthur Fellowship. He was elected a Fellow of the American Academy of Arts and Sciences in 1984.

He died in February 2019 at the age of 92.

Selected works

Books
  Editor.
 
  Editor.
 
  Edited with Michael Mandelbaum.

Essay

References

1926 births
2019 deaths
People from Berlin
Members of the Central Committee of the Polish United Workers' Party
Polish emigrants to the United States
American political scientists
Columbia University faculty
MacArthur Fellows
Columbia Graduate School of Arts and Sciences alumni
Fellows of the American Academy of Arts and Sciences
Academic staff of the Polish Academy of Sciences